The 3rd Northwest Territories Legislative Council was the 10th assembly of the territorial government. It lasted from 1957 until 1960.

Mid term appointments
This council had five seats reserved for appointed members.

By-elections
At least 1 by-election occurred in this Assembly.

References

External links
Northwest Territories Legislative Assembly homepage

Northwest Territories Legislative Assemblies